Group B of the 2010 Fed Cup Europe/Africa Zone Group I was one of four pools in the Europe/Africa Zone Group I of the 2010 Fed Cup. Four teams competed in a round-robin competition, with the top team and the bottom team proceeding to their respective sections of the play-offs: the top team played for advancement to the World Group II Play-offs, while the bottom team faced potential relegation to Group II.

Switzerland vs. Romania

Croatia vs. Portugal

Switzerland vs. Portugal

Croatia vs. Romania

Switzerland vs. Croatia

Romania vs. Portugal

See also
Fed Cup structure

References

External links
 Fed Cup website

2010 Fed Cup Europe/Africa Zone